The Tunisia women's national under-18 volleyball team, nicknamed Les Aigles de Carthage (The Eagles of Carthage or The Carthage Eagles), represents Tunisia in international volleyball competitions and friendly matches. The team is one of the leading nations in women's volleyball on the African continent.

Results
 Champions   Runners up   Third place   Fourth place

Red border color indicates tournament was held on home soil.

Summer Youth Olympics

FIVB U18 World Championship

African U18 Championship

See also
Tunisia women's national volleyball team
Tunisia women's national under-23 volleyball team
Tunisia women's national under-20 volleyball team
Tunisian Volleyball Federation

References

External links
Official website
FIVB profile

Volleyball
National women's under-18 volleyball teams
Volleyball in Tunisia
Women's sport in Tunisia